Volkher Häusler (born 14 August 1958) is a German conductor, composer and church musician. He is artistic director of the MendelssohnKammerChor in Berlin.

Life 
He then began studying music at the Hochschule für Musik und Theater München, where he was taught, among others, by Hedwig Bilgram and in choral conducting by Fritz Schieri. At a summer course, he was taught by the musicologist Wilhelm Ehmann. In 1980, he took part in a master class on Baroque performance practice, led by the tenor Ernst Haefliger and the conductor Diethard Hellmann. In 1981, he began additional studies in concert organ with Bilgram. In 1983, he completed his studies in Munich with the A exam.

In 1983, Häusler moved to Berlin where he worked as an organist and continued his studies at the Berlin University of the Arts in 1983. During his last two years of study in Berlin, Häusler worked as a répétiteur at the Theater Erfurt.

In 1986, Häusler founded the Kreuzberger Kantorei, a professional vocal ensemble, with whom he gave concert tours and made radio productions. He conducted several world premieres with them of works by Volker Wangenheim, with whom he completed further conducting studies from 2004 to 2006. The ensemble was renamed in 2005 to MendelssohnKammerChor Berlin, indicating a focus on the works by Felix Mendelssohn, his sister Fanny Hensel and Arnold Mendelssohn, and others of the period.

In 1992, he took part in a master class at the Internationale Bachakademie Stuttgart with Helmuth Rilling. He studied choral conducting with Gert Frischmuth and harpsichord with Bernhard Klapprott, and also took master classes with George Alexander Albrecht and Eric Ericson.

Since 2001, Häusler has also worked as a repetiteur with conducting duties as assistant to the Generalmusikdirektor at the Volkstheater Rostock. In 2004, he was a guest lecturer at the Hochschule für Musik und Tanz Köln.

Häusler is also active as a pianist,  and composer and teaches conducting, accompaniment, singing and choral voice training.

Recordings 
 Kreuzberger Kantorei / Volkher Häusler: Schütz, Bach, Distler (1993)
 Kreuzberger Kantorei / Volkher Häusler: Pepping-Collection – Volume 10: Missa Dona nobis pacem, Ein jegliches hat seine Zeit, Chorale movements
 MendelssohnKammerChor Berlin / Volkher Häusler: Lukas-Passion by Schütz (2004)

References

External links 
 

German choral conductors
German conductors (music)
1958 births
Living people
Musicians from Bavaria